Beryozovsky District is the name of several administrative and municipal districts in Russia. The name is generally derived from or related to the root "beryoza" (a birch).
Beryozovsky District, Khanty-Mansi Autonomous Okrug, an administrative and municipal district of Khanty-Mansi Autonomous Okrug
Beryozovsky District, Krasnoyarsk Krai, an administrative and municipal district of Krasnoyarsk Krai
Beryozovsky District, Perm Krai, an administrative and municipal district of Perm Krai

See also
Beryozovsky (disambiguation)
Berezovsky
Beryozovsky Urban Okrug

References